HMCS Ontario can refer to several ships:

 , a sixth-rate warship of the Provincial Marine (of then British North American Province of Quebec) and operated by the Royal Navy in Lake Ontario; sunk 1780
 , a  cruiser transferred to the Royal Canadian Navy in 1944 and scrapped in 1960
 HMCS Ontario, a Royal Canadian Sea Cadet summer training centre in Kingston, Ontario established in 1977 as  Cadets Camp Frontenac and now based at CFB Kingston/Royal Military College of Canada
 HMCS Ontario was a planned nuclear-powered  cancelled in 1989

References

 Government of Canada Ships' Histories - HMCS Ontario

See also
 Ontario (disambiguation)
 
 

Royal Canadian Navy ship names